The John Cattle Jr. House is a historic house in Seward, Nebraska. It was built in 1885 for John Cattle Jr., an English immigrant and co-founder of the  State Bank of Nebraska. Cattle lived here with his wife Blanche, a Welsh immigrant. It was designed in the Second Empire architectural style. It has been listed on the National Register of Historic Places since September 13, 1978.

The home has been extensively remodeled by Doug and Vikki Gremel since 1988.

References

		
National Register of Historic Places in Seward County, Nebraska
Second Empire architecture in Nebraska
Houses completed in 1885